In Greek mythology, the name Oenoe or Oinoe (Ancient Greek: Οἰνόη means "winy") may refer to:

Oenoe, an Arcadian nymph, one of the nurses of infant Zeus. She is probably the same as Oenoe, possible mother of Pan by Aether, and Oeneis, also a possible mother of Pan, this time by Zeus.
Oenoe, an impious Pygmy woman, wife of Nicodamas and mother of Mopsus. She was changed by Hera into a crane because of her impiety; Hera also made the Pygmies start a war against cranes. Oenoe, missing her son, would still come near the house where he lived, which caused the war to go on and on. This Oenoe is otherwise known as Gerana.
Oenoe, eponym of a deme in Attica (now Oinoi), sister of Epochus.
Oenoe or Oenoie, Naiad nymph of the homonymous island, mother of Sicinus by Thoas.
Oenoe, a Maenad follower of Dionysus.

Notes

References 

 Antoninus Liberalis, The Metamorphoses of Antoninus Liberalis translated by Francis Celoria (Routledge 1992). Online version at the Topos Text Project.
 Apollonius Rhodius, Argonautica translated by Robert Cooper Seaton (1853-1915), R. C. Loeb Classical Library Volume 001. London, William Heinemann Ltd, 1912. Online version at the Topos Text Project.
 Apollonius Rhodius, Argonautica. George W. Mooney. London. Longmans, Green. 1912. Greek text available at the Perseus Digital Library.
 Nonnus of Panopolis, Dionysiaca translated by William Henry Denham Rouse (1863-1950), from the Loeb Classical Library, Cambridge, MA, Harvard University Press, 1940.  Online version at the Topos Text Project.
 Nonnus of Panopolis, Dionysiaca. 3 Vols. W.H.D. Rouse. Cambridge, MA., Harvard University Press; London, William Heinemann, Ltd. 1940-1942. Greek text available at the Perseus Digital Library.
 Pausanias, Description of Greece with an English Translation by W.H.S. Jones, Litt.D., and H.A. Ormerod, M.A., in 4 Volumes. Cambridge, MA, Harvard University Press; London, William Heinemann Ltd. 1918. . Online version at the Perseus Digital Library
 Pausanias, Graeciae Descriptio. 3 vols. Leipzig, Teubner. 1903.  Greek text available at the Perseus Digital Library.

Nymphs
Africa in Greek mythology
Metamorphoses into birds in Greek mythology
Attican characters in Greek mythology
Arcadian mythology